Ray Finch MBE (27 November 1914 – 18 January 2012), formally Alfred Raymond Finch, was a respected English studio potter. who worked at Winchcombe Pottery for a period spanning seventy five years.

Biography

Early life
Finch was born in Streatham, south London; the eldest child of Alfred William Finch, a commercial clerk, and Rose Ethell Tinniswood.

Finch married Isabel Muriel Beesley, a teacher, in 1940. They had six sons, Anthony (born 1941), Nicholas (1942–1945), Peter (born 1944), Michael (born 1946), Joseph (born 1947), Paul (born 1949) and a daughter Marianne (born 1951).

Career
In 1926 Michael Cardew had founded Greet Potteries at Winchcombe, Gloucestershire, where he made pottery in the English slipware tradition, functional and affordable, and fired in a traditional bottle kiln. In 1935 Finch came to Gloucestershire and asked Cardew whether he could join the pottery. Cardew advised him to get basic skills first, and Finch went to the Central School of Art and Design, where he studied under Dora Billington and was recruited by Cardew in 1936. Finch took over the pottery, now known as Winchcombe Pottery, in 1939.

Finch was a deeply religious man, having converted to Roman Catholicism, and during the Second World War he registered as a conscientious objector, working in the National Fire Service. He restarted the pottery in 1946, and worked there until just before his death in 2012.

Finch was interested in stoneware, and in 1952 he started experimenting with the more difficult clay. The experiments were eventually successful and in 1954 the bottle kiln was fired for the last time, since it was too large and unsuitable for stoneware. Slipware production continued by using electric kilns, but was phased out in 1964. In 1974 the wood fired kiln was built to replace the oil fired kiln for stoneware production and has been used ever since.

When the Craft Potters Association's shop was opened in Carnaby street in 1960, Ray Finch's pottery was chosen for the opening exhibition.

Finch championed the workshop apprenticeship system and under his direction, many potters spent valuable time there including 
Colin Pearson, Jim Malone, John Leach (Grandson of Bernard Leach)  and Gwyn Hanssen Pigott (née John), and Peter Dick.

Finch managed Winchcombe pottery until 1979 when his son, Michael took over the running of the business 
, but he continued potting until 2011. Mike Finch still runs Winchcombe Pottery and his brother Joe Finch runs his own pottery in Wales.

Finch was appointed MBE in 1980 and was given a Lifetime Achievement Award in 1999 at the International Ceramics Festival, Aberystwyth.
Finch's work is represented in many collections of museums in Britain and overseas, including the V&A.

References

Books
Ron Wheeler, Winchcombe Pottery - The Cardew-Finch Tradition,
John Edgeler, Ray Finch Craftsman Potter of the Modern Age: A Collection of Essays and Contributions,

1914 births
2012 deaths
Alumni of the Central School of Art and Design
Members of the Order of the British Empire
People from Streatham
English conscientious objectors
English potters
English Roman Catholics